Events in the year 1836 in Japan.

Incumbents 
Monarch: Ninkō

Births
January 3 - Sakamoto Ryōma (d. 1867), samurai and rebel leader

 
1830s in Japan
Japan
Years of the 19th century in Japan